Warriston Cemetery is a cemetery in Edinburgh. It lies in Warriston, one of the northern suburbs of Edinburgh, Scotland. It contains many tens of thousands of graves, including notable Victorian and Edwardian figures, the most eminent being the physician Sir James Young Simpson.

It is located on the north side of the Water of Leith, and has an impressive landscape; partly planned, partly unplanned due to recent neglect. It lies in the Inverleith Conservation Area and is also a designated Local Nature Conservation Site. The cemetery is protected as a Category A listed building.

In July 2013 the Friends of Warriston Cemetery was inaugurated to reveal the heritage and to encourage appropriate biodiversity.

The address of the cemetery is 40C Warriston Gardens, Edinburgh EH3 5NE.

History

Designed in 1842 by Edinburgh architect David Cousin, the cemetery opened in 1843: the directors included Cousin and James Peddie (father of John Dick Peddie).

The first interment was towards the east, Margaret Parker, who was buried on 3 June 1843.

It was the first garden cemetery in Edinburgh, allowing the simplistic original title of The Edinburgh Cemetery, and provided a model for several other Scottish cemeteries. In its own right it was broadly based on ideas first introduced at Kensal Green Cemetery in London. Designed elements include a neo-Tudor line of catacombs. Their length was doubled in 1862 by architect John Dick Peddie. The chapel that once stood on top of the catacombs was demolished by 1930.

Soon after instigation (in 1845) the cemetery was divided by the Edinburgh Leith and Newhaven Railway which was built east to west through its southern half. A tunnel was added, with Gothic archways at its mouths, to link the north and south sections, but the south being smaller, was the inferior area from this date onwards. The embankments of the railway have been partly removed following its closure in the 1950s, and the line is now a public walkway.

In 1929, the Edinburgh Cemetery Company expanded their business into the new field of cremation, converting  East Warriston House (1818) into Warriston Crematorium on an adjacent site to the east. The architect was Sir Robert Lorimer, hence the title Lorimer Chapel for the main chapel. The crematorium was extended to the west in 1967 by the architect Esme Gordon. The cemetery lodge to the north-west dates from 1931 and was designed by architect J. R. McKay.

The cemetery was in private ownership until 1994, when it was compulsorily purchased by the City of Edinburgh Council. The long task of restoring the heavily overgrown and vandalised cemetery has begun, but still has far to go. Currently, only the upper (westmost) section is maintained. Many sections are now so densely overgrown that the stones are no longer visible and are simply bumps in the green undergrowth.

Arguably, the overgrown nature of the cemetery is its most attractive quality. There is something enchanting about wandering in amongst the head- and tomb-stones covered in ivy with a rich canopy of deciduous trees above, forming a natural mausoleum.

Monuments of architectural note
The Robertson mortuary chapel was erected in 1865 for Mary Ann Robertson (1826–1858), daughter of Brigadier-General Manson of the Bombay Artillery. The white marble shrine contained a sculpture of a reclining female figure, and was topped by a red glass roof, leading to the local nickname, the Tomb of the Red Lady. The monument was heavily vandalised and had to be demolished in the late 1980s.

Sir James Young Simpson's grave remains visible but the lower section has been infilled with earth to provide space for further burial.

Several eminent sculptors' work is found in the cemetery, including a fine portrait of William Young, horticulturist (1816–1896) by William Birnie Rhind, a monument to Robert Bryson by Thomas Stuart Burnett, and a wealth of fine ornate Celtic crosses by the McGlashens. A sizeable arched pedestal to the Rev James Peddie (d. 1845) by John Dick Peddie is also of note.

Notable persons interred and cremated

Interred

 George Aikman (1830–1905) artist and engraver
 Joseph Anderson (antiquarian) (1832–1916) keeper of the National Museum of Antiquities, and his son David Anderson, Lord St Vigeans
 Robert Rowand Anderson (1834–1921) architect
 George Angus (architect) (1798–1845)
 John Hutton Balfour (1808–1884) botanist
 Dr William Beilby (1783–1849) physician
 Thomas Vernon Bell MD (1824-1903) homeopath
 Adam Black (1784–1874), publisher, Lord Provost and Member of Parliament for Edinburgh
 Samuel Blackburn (1813–1856) portrait artist
 Hippolyte Blanc (1844–1917), architect
 William Graham Boss (1847–1927) stained glass designer
 Major General James Roper Boswall (1826–1883)
 John Crawford Brown (1805–1867) landscape artist
 Sir William Slater Brown (1844-1917) Lord Provost of Edinburgh 1909-12
 William Alexander Bryson FRSE (d. 1906) creator of the public electric lighting system in Leith in 1897 (one of the first in the world) - stone vandalised
 Alexander Buchan (meteorologist) (1829–1907), creator of the map-based weather forecast
 Sir John James Burnet (1857–1938), architect
 Archibald Burns (1831–1880), photographer
 Rev Dugald Butler (1862-1926) author (in the Marwick grave)
 William Archibald Cadell FRSE (1775–1855) historian, mathematician and owner of the Carron Company
 James Cadenhead (1858–1927) artist
 Dr Colin Cadman (1916–1971), plant pathologist and mycologist
 Robert Macfarlane Cameron (1860–1920) architect
 Lorne MacLaine Campbell (1902–1991) Victoria Cross recipient
 Sir John Cheyne (1841–1907)
 Sir Thomas Clark (1823–1900), Lord Provost of Edinburgh (1865–1888)
 James Scarth Combe (1795-1883) physician
 Prof Arthur Connell (1794–1863), FRSE
 Alexander Hunter Crawford (1865–1945) architect
 William Crawford (1858-1926) creator of Crawfords Biscuits
 Mary Crudelius (1839–1877) early campaigner for female education
 John Cumming (artist) (1824–1908) father of William Skeoch Cumming
 John Cunningham (architect) (1799–1873)
 James Currie (shipowner) (1863–1930), owner of the Currie Line
 Commodore James Dalgleish (1891–1964)
 Sir David Deas (1807–1876), naval physician, with his architect son, Francis William Deas (1862–1951)
 George Deas, Lord Deas (1804–1887)
 William H. Dowbiggin (1780–1848) veteran of the Battle of Waterloo, son-in-law of William Maule, 1st Baron Panmure
 Sir David Dumbreck (1805–1876) memorial only
 John Gillison Dunbar (1874–1958) creator of Dunbar's lemonade
 General Alexander Duncan (1780-1859)
 Thomas Duncan (painter) (1807–1845)
 David Dundas, Lord Dundas (1854–1922) law lord
 Robert William Dundas, MC, Legion of Honour, (1881–1928) military hero and solicitor, co-founder of Dundas & Wilson
Elizabeth Marianne Erskine (1871–1942) early female surgeon
 David Taylor Fish FRHA (1824–1901) botanist and author
 William Flockhart (1809–1871) chemist, joint founder of Duncan Flockhart & Co
 Robert Gavin (1827–1883) artist
 Robert Gibb (1845–1932), artist, most remembered for the painting The Thin Red Line and his elder brother William Gibb (1839-1929)
 Robert Fleming Gourlay (1778–1863) Scottish-Canadian politician
 Frederick Richard Graham-Yooll (died 1931) inventor
 Andrew Grant (MP) (1830–1924) Liberal politician
 Very Rev James Grant DD FRSE (1800–1890) Director of Scottish Widows 1840 to 1890 and Moderator of the General Assembly of the Church of Scotland in 1854, father of above Andrew Grant
 Prof John Russell Greig FRSE (1889–1963) veterinarian and creator of "clean milk"
 Sir Louis Stewart Gumley (1870–1941), Lord Provost of Edinburgh 1935–38
 Samuel Halkett (1814–1877) librarian and author
 Sir George Harrison (1812–1885), Lord Provost of Edinburgh 1882-5
 Sir George Harvey (1805–1876) artist.
 David Ramsay Hay (1798–1866) artist and author
 Alfred Trevor Haynes (1907–1969) President of the Faculty of Actuaries 1962–64
 Alexander Henry (1818–1894), gunsmith, First Edinburgh Rifle Volunteer, JP and Edinburgh Town Councillor
 James Howie (1845–1910) photographer
 John Howkins (civil engineer) (1840–1966)
 Edith Hughes (architect) (1888–1971) Scotland's first female architect
 William Hurst (civil engineer) (1810–1890) Scottish engineer linked to the early development of railways
 Robert Kirk Inches (1845-1918) Lord Provost of Edinburgh 1912-16 (one of the few graves of interest in the south section)
 Cosmo Innes (1798–1874) judge, author and antiquarian. A member of the Edinburgh Calotype Club one of the world's first photographic societies
 Professor Robert Jameson (1774–1854), naturalist and mineralogist
 Feliks Janiewicz (1762–1848), Polish composer and violinist in exile
 James Jardine (1776–1858) civil engineer
 Alexander Karley RN (1785-1859) Royal Navy Commander of ships such as HMS Apollo
 Alexander Keiller (1811–1892), physician and obstetrician; introduced gynaecological teaching into the Edinburgh Medical School
 Philip Kelland (1808–1879), English mathematician
 John Falconer King FIC FCS (1846–1919) Edinburgh city analyst
 Count Walerian Krasiński (1795–1855), Polish Calvinist politician, nationalist and historian
 Robert Scott Lauder (1803–1869), artist (monument by John Hutchison)
 James Eckford Lauder (1811–1869), artist, buried with his older brother Robert Scott Lauder
 Rev Prof Alexander Lawson DD (1852–1921) professor of English Literature at St Andrews University
 Thomas Livingstone Learmonth (1818–1903) Tasmanian politician, nephew of John Learmonth
 Charles Lees RSA (1800–1880) artist
 John Allan Lindsay (1865–1942) the final Provost of Leith 1917–1920
 Hilda Lockhart Lorimer (1873–1954) classical scholar, and her brother John Gordon Lorimer (1870-1914)
 Professor David Low (1786–1859), agriculturalist
 William Henry Lowe MD (1815-1900) physician and botanist
 Charles Somerville MacAlester (1797–1891) - grave vandalised
 Horatio McCulloch (1806–1867), artist (monument by John Rhind)
 Very Rev Robert MacDonald (1813-1893) Moderator of the General Assembly of the Free Church of Scotland in 1882
 Robert MacFarlane, Lord Ormidale (1802–1880) law lord
 Stewart McGlashan (1807–1873) sculptor
 Alastair Macintyre (1913-1979) broadcaster
 Gillian Maclaine (1798–1840) adventurer, memorial only - lost at sea with his family
 Sir John Lorne MacLeod (1873–1946) Lord Provost of Edinburgh 1916 to 1919
 The Very Rev John McMurtrie DD (1831–1912) Moderator of the General Assembly of the Church of Scotland in 1904
 Prof William Ramsay McNab (1844–1889), botanist (memorial on parents' grave)
 Duncan McNeill, 1st Baron Colonsay and Oronsay (1793–1874), advocate and Tory politician; Lord Justice General and Lord President of the Court of Session (1852–1867)
 Charles Hodge Mackie (1862-1920) artist
 Sir Richard Mackie (1851–1923) Provost of Leith, 1899 to 1908
 Very Rev Thomas Main (1813-1881) Moderator of the General Assembly of the Free Church of Scotland
 Sir James David Marwick (1826–1908)
 Very Rev Alexander Martin DD LLD (1857–1946) Principal of New College, Edinburgh
 Frances Helen Melville (1873 – 1962) suffragist, academic
 John Menzies (1808–1879), founder of the national newsagent chain bearing his name
 Thomas Menzies (1847–1901), major shipbuilder in Leith
 Prof Thomas Hugh Milroy LLD FRSE (1869–1950) physiologist, organic chemist and Vice President of the Royal Society of Edinburgh
 Hugh Morton (1812–1878) civil engineer
 Claud Muirhead (1835–1910) owner and editor of the Edinburgh Advertiser
 Charles Murray, Lord Murray (1866–1936) law lord, and his son, Keith Anderson Hope Murray (1903–1993)
 Charles Neaves, Lord Neaves (1800–1876) Scottish judge
 Patrick Neill (naturalist) (1776–1851)
 William Nicol (1770–1851), physicist and geologist
 Alexander Nicolson (1827–1893) scholar and mountaineer
 Cpt John Orr (died 1879) who fought at Waterloo
 John H. Oswald (1830–1899) landscape artist
 George Outram (1805–1856), humorist and editor of the Glasgow Herald
 Walter Gray Pattison (1829–1890) whisky distiller and blender (in "secret garden")
 Sir William Peck (1862–1925), astronomer
 Alexander Peddie (1810–1907), physician and author; and his nephew--
 John Dick Peddie (1824–1891), architect (see above)
 David Bruce Peebles (1819–1892) engineer
 Major General Robert Pitman CB HEIC (1777-1846)
 James Pocock (1777–1857) veteran of the Battle of Waterloo
 James Pringle (1822–1886), businessman and Provost of Leith (1881–86)
 Harold Raeburn (1865–1926), mountaineer
 Richard Ramage (1834–1920) co-founder of Ramage & Ferguson shipbuilders in Leith
 Alexander Ramsay (1777–1847), architect
 John Rhind (1828–1892), sculptor (also his sons William Birnie Rhind and Thomas Duncan Rhind in the same plot)
 Dr William Robertson FRSE (1818–1882), physician and statistician
 John Merry Ross LLD (1833–1883) author
 Theodore Salvesen (1863-1942)
 John Sheriff (1816-1844) ARSA, artist - one of the first burials
 John Siveright (1779–1856), of the Hudson's Bay Company
 Sir James Young Simpson (1811–1870), pioneer of anaesthetics
 John Smart (landscape artist) (1838–1899)
 Alexander Smith (1829–1867), Scottish poet (monument carved by John Rhind)
 John Smith (1825–1910), surgeon and dentist, FRSE, FRCS, founder of the Edinburgh Dental Hospital, Queen Victoria's dentist
 Malcolm Smith (Scottish politician) (1856–1935), MP plus Provost of Leith 1908–17
 Rev Walter Chalmers Smith (1824–1908) hymn-writer
 John Stevenson (1790–1831) Sir Walter Scott's "True Jock"
 Prof Charles Hunter Stewart FRSE (1854–1924) public health expert
 Archibald Buchanan Stirling (1811-1881) conservator (south section)
 James Hutchison Stirling (1820–1909) philosopher
 Admiral Pringle Stoddart (1768–1848)
 Sir John Struthers (1823–1899), surgeon and anatomist
 John Stuart (genealogist) (1813–1877)
 Captain Francis Stupart (Scots Greys), Cavalry Officer who fought in the Battle of Waterloo
 William Swan (physicist) (1818–1894) FRSE (in "secret garden") discoverer of the Swan band
 Sir William Taylour Thomson (1813–1883) military officer and diplomat (a noteworthy double sarcophagus paired with his wife)
 Thomas Jameson Torrie (d. 1858), advocate, geologist, mineralogist and botanist
 Sir John Batty Tuke (1835–1913) eminent psychiatrist
Dr Catherine Jane Urquhart (1845–1902) early female doctor (graduated from the London School of Medicine for Women in 1892)
 George Waterston (1808–1893) stationer, founder of Waterston &sons, not to be confused with the Bookshop
 William Williams (1832–1900), Welsh veterinary surgeon, principal of the Dick Vet College
 Dr Andrew Wood (1810–1881) President of the Royal College of Surgeons of Edinburgh

Cremated

The crematorium is on a separate site, east of the main cemetery. It has several areas of remembrance, the oldest being the oak-panelled rooms in the basement. To the north, there is both a Rose Garden and Water Garden  holding memorials. The Book of Remembrance is opened to the date each day, for those marking the anniversary of a death. A computerised version of the Book of Remembrance is also available, enabling other dates to be viewed.
 Alfred Adler (1870–1937), Austrian psychotherapist and founder of the school of individual psychology. Moved April 2011 to Austria
 Sapper Adam Archibald (1879–1957), VC recipient World War I
 Captain Charles George Bonner (1884–1951), Royal Navy Victoria Cross recipient World War I.
 Anthony Chenevix-Trench (1919–1979), Headmaster of Eton and Fettes Colleges
 Brigadier Arthur Edward Cumming (1896–1971), VC recipient, Malaya, World War II
 Frederick Gardiner (radiologist) FRSE (1874–1933), dermatologist and x-ray pioneer/martyr
 Andrew Gilzean (1877–1957) MP
 Tom Hart (1922–1982) chairman of Hibernian Football Club
 Sir Robert Lorimer (1868–1929), architect. One of the first cremations, his ashes are buried with his parents at Newburn, Fife.
 Lieutenant David Lowe MacIntyre (1895–1967), Army VC recipient, World War I
 Ebenezer James MacRae (1881–1951), City Architect for Edinburgh
 Sir Frank Mears (1880–1953) architect and town planner
 Don Revie (1927–1989), English footballer and manager
 Captain Henry Peel Ritchie (1879–1958), Royal Navy VC recipient, East Africa, World War I
 Drum-Major Walter Potter Ritchie (1892–1965), VC recipient, Battle of the Somme, World War I
 Prof James Lorrain Smith (1862–1931) anatomist
 Alexander Burns Wallace (1906-1974) Scottish plastic surgeon
 Sir Charles Laing Warr (1892–1969), Minister of The High Church of St Giles, Edinburgh, and Dean of the Thistle and Chapel Royal Scotland (1926–1969)

War graves
Warriston Cemetery contains 100 graves of Commonwealth service personnel, 72 from World War I and 27 from World War II, besides a grave of a Belgian soldier.  The cemetery also contains a CWGC memorial, at the end of the columbarium, in the form of panels listing 142 Commonwealth service personnel of World War II who were cremated here.

Botanical
Among trees of note in Warriston Cemetery are two purple-leaved elms and a concave-leaved elm, both among the rarer of pre-Dutch Elm Disease cultivars.

References

External links 

 Geographic coordinates: 
 Friends of Warriston Cemetery website
 Friends of Warriston Cemetery Facebook page
 Friends of Warriston Cemetery Twitter page

Monuments and memorials in Scotland
Cemeteries in Edinburgh
Category A listed buildings in Edinburgh
Commonwealth War Graves Commission cemeteries in Scotland
1843 establishments in Scotland